Extraordinary Commission or Emergency Commission most often refers to:

Organisations 
 The Commission extraordinaire des Douze or Extraordinary Commission of Twelve, which prosecuted political conspirators in France during 1793
 A literal translation of the Russian language term Чрезвычайная Комиссия (Chrezvychaynaya Komissiya, Extraordinary/Emergency Commission), which had the Cyrillic initials ЧК (ChK) pronounced tche-ka, such as:
 The Cheka, a colloquial name for the Soviet secret police from 1918 as well as national affiliates such as:
 The All-Ukrainian Extraordinary Commission (VUChK)  in 1918–1922
 The Soviet Extraordinary State Commission (ChGK)  of 1942–1947, which investigated war crimes committed by Axis forces

Other uses 
 A commission (document) affirming the appointment of a particular person as a government official or military officer, under extraordinary or emergency conditions